PKF International (previously known as Pannell Kerr Forster) is a global network of firms.  The network's 224 member firms operate under the PKF brand in 150 countries across 5 regions. PKF International has 20,000 professionals and is currently ranked 14th international accountancy network by International Accounting Bulletin.

In 2018 PKF was ranked as 11th largest global accounting firm in the United Kingdom.

The International Accounting Bulletin placed PKF at 15th globally based on their world survey, conducted in February 2019.

History

Pannell Kerr Forster was founded in 1969 when four accountancy firms from Australia, Canada, the United Kingdom and the United States joined together to create an international association. The four firms were:
 Pannell Fitzpatrick & Co, founded in 1869 by William Henry Pannell (UK);
 Harris, Kerr, Forster & Co, founded in 1911 as Harris, Kerr & Co by William Harris & Errol Kerr, and in 1923 as WJ Forster & Co by William Forster (USA);
 Campbell, Sharp, Nash & Field (Canada); and
 Wilson, Bishop, Bowes & Craig (Australia).

In 1980, member firms decided to use Pannell Kerr Forster as their common brand name to create an international accountancy brand. In 2000, member firms decided to shorten their name to PKF. Member firms are now adopting this name in their home markets, or adding PKF as a prefix to the existing firm name.

, over 21,000 staff were employed by PKF International member firms.

In 2013, PKF's associate firm in UK defected and joined BDO after a fall in revenue and staff reduction.

In 2016, PKF's associate firm in Hong Kong was banned by the Public Company Accounting Oversight Board for three years due to not co-operating with a probe.

References

External links

PKF London & Leeds: PKF Littlejohn
Spain: PKF Attest
South Africa 
UK & Ireland: 

Accounting firms of the United Kingdom
Financial services companies established in 1969